Jean Constance D'Costa (born 13 January 1937) is a Jamaican children's novelist, linguist, and professor emeritus. Her novels have been praised for their use of both Jamaican Creole and Standard English.

Early life and education
Jean Constance Creary was born in St. Andrew, Jamaica, the youngest of three children to parents who were school teachers. Her father was also a Methodist minister. They moved to the capital, Kingston in 1944, and then to St. James and Trelawny. She attended rural elementary schools, and then St. Hilda's High School in Brown's Town, St. Ann from 1949 to 1954 on a government merit scholarship. She earned another scholarship to pursue a bachelor's degree in English literature and language at University College of the West Indies (now UWI, Mona) from 1955 to 1958, and another scholarship for a master's degree in literature at Oxford University.

Career
In 1962, after Oxford, she returned to teach Old English and linguistics at University College of the West Indies. She also served as a consultant to Jamaica's  Ministry of Education on education in Jamaica in the newly independent country, and served on various education committees.

D'Costa continued her creative writing while teaching and consulting. Her two most popular novels, Sprat Morrison (1972) and Escape to Last Man Peak (1976), have been used in schools throughout Jamaica and the Caribbean region. Her novels are geared primarily towards children aged 11 to 13. She researched and wrote extensively on Jamaican creole culture., and published handbooks for service agencies in Jamaica, including the Kingston office of the United States Peace Corps.

In 1980, D'Costa received a professorship at Hamilton College where she stayed until 1998. She taught Old English, Caribbean literature, creative writing, and linguistics.

Themes
Writing for children on the cusp of teenhood, D'Costa addresses "their need to relate to actuality ... and their need to retain some of the comforting illusions of childhood". To satisfy the latter need, she draws from Jamaican folklore and oral traditions for the plots, themes, and tone of her works. Prominent in Caribbean folklore are "duppy stories", in which ghosts or unsettled spirits return to haunt the land of the living. In her third novel, Voice in the Wind, for example, D'Costa addresses children's perceptions about death and the supernatural. She also references the oral tales that were traditionally told "at wakes and nine-nights". D'Costa paints a vivid picture of historical and contemporary Jamaican countryside.

D'Costa often uses Jamaican Creole for dialogue alongside Standard English. Her use of language, together with her understanding that her works are models for children's own literary attempts, makes her books natural subjects for classroom discussion. Sprat Morrison has been required reading in the "first grade" of Jamaican high schools since 1972, while Escape to Last Man Peak and Voice in the Wind are assigned by many teachers. Students have corresponded with D'Costa and she has accepted invitations to speak in schools. Her works have been lauded for preserving and conveying Jamaican speech rhythms and dialect.

Personal life
D'Costa retired from Hamilton College in 1998, with the title of professor emeritus. She married David D'Costa, a journalist, in 1967. They relocated to Florida in 1997.

Awards and recognition
Children's Writers Award (Jamaican Reading Association, 1976)
Gertrude Flesh Bristol Award (Hamilton College, 1984)
Silver Musgrave Medal (Institute of Jamaica, 1994) for contributions to children's literature and linguistics

Selected works

Novels and short stories

 (with Hazel D. Campbell)

 (2nd edition, 1990)

Anthologies
 (with Velma Pollard)

Books
  (with Barbara Lalla and Velma Pollard)
  (with Barbara Lalla)
  (with Barbara Lalla)

Linguistic handbooks

 (with Jack Berry)

References

External links
"Great read for children" Jamaica Gleaner News, 23 April 2006

1937 births
Recipients of the Musgrave Medal
Living people
Women anthologists
Jamaican women children's writers
20th-century Jamaican women writers
21st-century Jamaican women writers
20th-century Jamaican novelists
21st-century Jamaican novelists
People from Saint Andrew Parish, Jamaica
Jamaican women novelists